The men's 100 metre breaststroke SB7 event at the 2020 Paralympic Games took place on 1 September 2020, at the Tokyo Aquatics Centre. The event consisted of a straight final, with no heats.

Final 
The final was held on 1 September 2021.

References

Swimming at the 2020 Summer Paralympics